Seth Grant  is an Australian neuroscientist and Professor of Molecular Neuroscience at the University of Edinburgh in Scotland. He previously worked as a principal investigator at the Wellcome Trust Sanger Institute in Cambridge, England. He is known for his research on the biological basis of brain diseases. He was elected a fellow of the Academy of Medical Sciences in 2015. He is also an elected Fellow of the Royal Society of Edinburgh.

See also 

 Human Brain Project
 Javier de Felipe

References

External links
Faculty page

Australian neuroscientists
Living people
Academics of the University of Edinburgh
Australian emigrants to Scotland
Scientists from Sydney
University of Sydney alumni
Fellows of the Academy of Medical Sciences (United Kingdom)
Fellows of the Royal Society of Edinburgh
Year of birth missing (living people)